The 1953 NCAA basketball tournament involved 22 schools playing in single-elimination play to determine the national champion of NCAA college basketball. The 15th edition of the tournament began on March 10, 1953, and ended with the championship game on March 18 in Kansas City, Missouri. A total of 26 games were played, including a third-place game in each region and a national third-place game.

Indiana, coached by Branch McCracken, won the tournament title with a 69–68 victory in the final game over Kansas, coached by Phog Allen. B. H. Born of Kansas was named the tournament's Most Outstanding Player. The Hoosiers became the third team, after Oklahoma A&M in 1945-46 and Kentucky in 1948-49, to win two titles and the second of three teams to win titles in their first two tournament appearances (after Oklahoma A&M); however, unlike Oklahoma A&M before them and San Francisco after, their first two tournament appearances were 13 years apart.

Locations
The following are the sites selected to host each round of the 1953 tournament:

East-1 Region

First round (March 10)
The Palestra, Philadelphia, Pennsylvania

East-1 Regional (March 13 and 14)
Reynolds Coliseum, Raleigh, North Carolina

East-2 Region

First round (March 10)
Allen County War Memorial Coliseum, Fort Wayne, Indiana

East-2 Regional (March 12 and 13)
Chicago Stadium, Chicago, Illinois

West-1 Region

West-1 Regional (March 12 and 13)
Ahearn Field House, Manhattan, Kansas

West-2 Region

First round (March 10)
Hec Edmundson Pavilion, Seattle, Washington
Stanford Pavilion, Palo Alto, California

West-2 Regional (March 13 and 14)
Oregon State Coliseum, Corvallis, Oregon

Final Four

March 17 and 18
Municipal Auditorium, Kansas City, Missouri

For the fourth time, Kansas City's Municipal Auditorium was the host of the National Championship, its first as a full-fledged Final Four site. With the expansion of the field, the number of host venues also expanded, with three of the nine venues being new to the tournament. Both venues in the East-1 region were repeat venues, with Reynolds Coliseum hosting for the third straight year and the Palestra returning to the tournament for the first time since the inaugural year of 1939. In the East-2 region, Chicago Stadium once again hosted the Sweet Sixteen and Elite Eight. For the first time, the city of Fort Wayne hosted tournament games, at the Allen County War Memorial Coliseum, home to the Fort Wayne Pistons of the NBA. The West-1 regional had no first-round games, with the Sweet Sixteen and Elite Eight held at then-Kansas State College and Ahearn Field House. In the West-2 region, Oregon State Coliseum again hosted, with first-round games held at both Hec Edmundson Pavilion and, for the first time, at the Pavilion on the campus of Stanford University, the first games held in California since the 1939 tournament.

This would be the only tournament ever hosted on the Stanford campus, and the last time Chicago Stadium would be used as a venue, with various other sites used around the area since.

Teams

Bracket

East-1 Region

East-2 Region

West-1 Region

West-2 Region

Final Four

Notes
 As would be expected with the expanded field, a then-record ten teams - Eastern Kentucky, Fordham, Hardin-Simmons, Idaho State, Lebanon Valley, LSU, Miami University, Notre Dame, Penn and Seattle - made their tournament debut. The record would be broken in 1955 with eleven new teams, and again in 1981 with twelve newcomers. 
Lebanon Valley College, at 425 students, would become by far the smallest school to ever field a team, as well as win a game, in the NCAA tournament. Following the 1956 split of the NCAA into University and College divisions, as well as the subsequent split into the current three division format, it is most likely that this record will never be broken. This would be LVC's only appearance in the tournament; they are also the only team from the tournament to not play in the tournament again.

See also
 1953 National Invitation Tournament
 1953 NAIA Basketball Tournament

References

NCAA Division I men's basketball tournament
Ncaa
NCAA  Basketball Tournament
NCAA basketball tournament